Joan "Wilkie" Wilkinson (5 April 1919 – 17 April 2002) was an English cricketer who played as a right-handed batter and right-arm off break bowler. She appeared in 13 Test matches for England between 1949 and 1958. She played domestic cricket for various composite XIs, including teams representing the North of England.

References

External links
 
 

1919 births
2002 deaths
Sportspeople from Lancashire
England women Test cricketers